Arcobara multilineata is a moth of the  family Geometridae. It is found in south-eastern Arizona and Mexico.

The length of the forewings is 10–12 mm.

References

Moths described in 1887
Sterrhini
Moths of North America